Azuli Records was a British independent record label, focusing mainly on house music and other forms of electronic dance music. The label was founded by DJ Dave Piccioni in London, England in 1991 but went into liquidation in April 2009. Some of its back catalogue was sold to Phoenix Music International Ltd. The label was re-launched by Piccioni and administered by Defected Records. In 2012, the label was sold to Defected Records.

Releases included the Choice series.

History
The Azuli Records label was the UK's longest-running house label, releasing a total of 278 singles on Azuli Label and over 60 albums.Dave Piccioni, a DJ who had lived in New York's formative house community, began by selling 12" singles from the back of a van.

In 1990, Piccioni took over Black Market Records shop in London, and in 1991 he started Azuli Records.

Azuli's debut release was Chocolate Fudge's "In A Fantasy". By the mid-1990s, the label began to have UK chart crossover hits.

In 1998, Azuli released the hit single "Needin' U" by David Morales, followed by other hits including Eclipse's "Makes Me Love You" (1999) and Afro Medusa's "Pasilda"  (2000), the latter of which reached number 31 in the UK Singles Chart in October 2000. The label has since released over 200 singles and a number of compilations albums by Frankie Knuckles, Joey Negro, François K and Danny Tenaglia.

Azuli have also released a number of DJ mix album and compilation album series':

The Choice compilation series are retrospective albums, wherein all tracks are selected by renowned DJs. DJ's include Danny Tenaglia, Tony Humphries, François K and Derrick L. Carter, X-Press 2, Jeff Mills and John Digweed.

The label also releases annual compilation CD entitled Miami, Space: Ibiza and Made in Italy.

Finally, the Club Azuli project was a compilation series featuring current dancefloor hits, in both mixed and unmixed versions. Club Azuli is also the title of Azuli's event program which, for the past two years, has been visiting the finest clubs across the globe.

Discography

Choice Series
 Derrick L. Carter 2 x CD Album
 Roger Sanchez (Unmixed) 2 x CD Album
 Roger Sanchez (Mixed) 2 x CD Album
 Louie Vega (Unmixed) Limited Edition 2 x CD Album
 Kenny Dope (Unmixed) 2 x CD Album
 Kenny Dope (Mixed) 2 x CD Album
 Danny Howells (Unmixed) 2 x CD Album
 Danny Howells 2 x CD Album
 John Digweed 2 x CD Album
 Xpress 2 2 x CD Album
 Jeff Mills 2 x CD Album
 Louie Vega 2 x CD Album
 Tony Humphries 2 x CD Album
 Danny Tenaglia 2 x CD Album
 Francois K 2 x CD Album
 Frankie Knuckles 2 x CD Album

House / club albums
 Miami 2008 (Unmixed Limited Edition) 2 x CD Album
 Miami 2008 (Mixed) 2 x CD Album
 Club Azuli 5 Vinyl Sampler 2 x LP Album
 Club Azuli 5 (Unmixed) - Future Sound Of The Dance Underground 2 x CD Album
 Azuli Presents - Space Annual 2007 (Unmixed) 2 x CD Album
 Azuli Presents - Space Annual 07 (Mixed) 2 x CD Album
 Club Azuli 5 (Mixed) - Future Sound Of The Dance Underground 2 x CD Album
 Club Azuli Ibiza 2007 Unmixed 2 x CD Album
 Las Tardes En Ibiza 2007 2 x CD Album
 Club Azuli Ibiza (Mixed) - Future Sound Of The Dance Underground 2 x CD Album
 Space Ibiza 2007 Unmixed 2 x CD Album
 Azuli Presents - Space Ibiza 07 2 x CD Album
 Space Tranquil - Volumen Tres CD Album
 Miami 2007 (Mixed) 2 x CD Album
 Club Azuli 2007 (Unmixed) - Future Sound Of The Dance Underground 2 x CD Album
 Club Azuli 2007 (Mixed) - Future Sound Of The Dance Underground 2 x CD Album
 Space Annual #1 (Unmixed) 2 x CD Album
 Space Annual #1 (Mixed) 2 x CD Album
 Circo Loco 2006 - Mixed by Tania Vulcano & Cirillo 2 x CD Album
 Club Azuli 02/06 (Unmixed) - Future Sound Of The Dance Underground 2 x CD Album
 Club Azuli 02/06 (Mixed) - Future Sound Of The Dance Underground 2 x CD Album
 Azuli Presents - Space Tranquil Volumen Dos CD Album
 Azuli Presents - Space Ibiza 06 2 x CD Album
 Azuli Presents - Miami 2006 Unmixed 2 x CD Album
 Azuli Presents - Miami 2006 Mixed 2 x CD Album
 Club Azuli (DJ Unmixed) - Future Sound Of The Dance Underground (Unmixed) 2 x CD Album
 Club Azuli (Mixed) - Future Sound Of The Dance Underground 2 x CD Album
 Azuli Presents - Space Tranquil Volumen Uno CD Album
 Azuli Presents - Space Ibiza 04 2 x CD Album
 Azuli Presents - Miami 2005 Unmixed 2 x CD Album
 Azuli Presents - Miami 2005 Mixed 2 x CD Album
 Azuli Presents - Space Ibiza 05 2 x CD Album
 Big Wheels Of Azuli 2 x CD Album
 Azuli Presents - Miami 2004 2 x CD Album
 Azuli Presents - Miami 2002 2 x CD Album
 Azuli Presents - Miami 2001 2 x CD Album
 Joey Negro - Back To The Scene of The Crime CD Album
 Black Market Presents - 2 Step Volume 2 CD Album
 Azuli Presents - Miami 2000 CD Album
 Black Market Presents - 2 Step Volume 1 CD Album
 Joey Negro - Can't Get High Without You CD Album
 Romanthony - Romanworld CD Album
 Another Fine Mess - Fila Brazillia CD Album
 Another Fine Mess - Fila Brazillia 3 x LP Album
 Another Fine Mess - FC Kahuna CD Album
 Another Fine Mess - FC Kahuna 2 x LP Album
 Space: Ibiza 2003 (Mixed By Smokin Jo & Reche) 2 x CD Album
 Azuli Presents - Miami 2003 2 x CD Album
 Azuli Presents - Vertigo CD Album
 Azuli Presents - Wild Fruit 2 x CD Album
 Azuli Presents - Faith Vol. 2 2 x CD Album
 La Troya - Ibiza 2008
 Space Ibiza 08 Unmixed Limited Edition
 Space Ibiza 08 Las Tardes en Ibiza 2008 -
 10th Anniversary Groove Armada - Are Friends Electric
 Choice - Derrick L. Carter
 Miami 2008 (Unmixed Limited Edition)
 Miami 2008 (Mixed)
 Club Azuli 5 Vinyl Sampler
 Club Azuli 5 (Unmixed) - Future Sound Of The Dance Underground
 Azuli Presents - Space Annual 2007 (Unmixed)
 Club Azuli 5 (Unmixed) - Future Sound Of The Dance Underground

Events
 Club Azuli

References

Downloads
 Mix Downloads

External links
 Official site
 Phoenix Music International

British independent record labels
Record labels established in 1991
Record labels disestablished in 2009
Record labels established in 2011
Re-established companies
1991 establishments in England
House music record labels
English electronic dance music record labels